Saint-Adrien may refer to:

 Saint-Adrien, Côtes-d'Armor, France
 Saint-Adrien, Quebec, Canada

See also
 Saint-Adrien-d'Irlande, Quebec, Canada
 Bosc-Guérard-Saint-Adrien, France
 Le Mont-Saint-Adrien, France
 
 Adrien, name